The  is a museum located in the city of Goshogawara, Aomori Prefecture, Japan.

The museum has exhibits related to Goshogawara's Tachineputa Festival, which is held every August. It houses three tachineputa floats, as well as a production studio where visitors can see the creation process of the floats. The museum also has a gallery with works created by artists connected to Aomori.

References

External links

  

Museums in Aomori Prefecture
Goshogawara